Merchant Taylors' Hall may refer to:

 Merchant Taylors' Hall, London, the hall of the Worshipful Company of Merchant Taylors
 Merchant Taylors' Hall, York, the hall of the York Taylors' Guild

Architectural disambiguation pages